Highworth railway station served the town of Highworth, Wiltshire, England,  
from 1883 to 1962 on the Highworth branch line.

History 
The station was opened on 9 May 1883 by Great Western Railway. It closed to normal passengers on 2 March 1953 but it remained open for employees at Swindon Works until 2 August 1962.

References 

Disused railway stations in Wiltshire
Former Great Western Railway stations
Railway stations in Great Britain opened in 1883
Railway stations in Great Britain closed in 1953
1883 establishments in England
1962 disestablishments in England